Disguise, is a 2018 Nigerian comedy film directed by Desmond Elliot and coproduced by Agatha Amata and Victor Okpala. The film stars IK Ogbonna and Nancy Isime in the lead roles whereas Wale Ojo, Toyin Abraham, Daniel K Daniel and Desmond Elliot made supportive roles. The film revolves around Lambo and Nengi, a couple of friends who decide to disguise themselves as different genders to find the truth worth N10 million.

The film received mixed reviews from critics and screened worldwide.

Cast
 IK Ogbonna as Belinda / Lambo 
 Nancy Isime as Nengi / Melvin
 Wale Ojo as Theophilus Vaughn
 Toyin Abraham as Gigi
 Daniel K Daniel as Romulus
 Desmond Elliot as George
 Stephen Damian as Russell
 Afanye Daniel as Jude
 Emem Iniobong as Rachael 
 Tomi Makanjuola as Selena
 Chy Nwakanma as Kate
 Chioma Nwosu as Shelly
 David Grey Obiala as Grey 
 Helen Enado Odigie as Gina 
 Nneka Ofulue as Romulus' Secretary
 Victor Okpala as Pastor
 Bright Nwachineke as Theophilus' Security Man
 Rosalyn Sheri as Rosalyn
 Faith Adibe as Student
 Moses Aleka as Guy 1
 Justin Ben as Guy 2
 Nwokolo Chinaza as Terrified Girl
 Eze Chinonso as Student
 Oribhabor Dickson as Grey Boy
 Ibeyh Edith as Student
 Badejoko Busayo as Student
 Uchechi Ejiogu as Gigi's Secretary
 Osunde Loveth as Student
 Ngozi Onuoha as Classmate 2
 Guddy Udeozor as Classmate 1
 Olasimbo Yetunde as Sexy Girl
 Lamboginny as guest Artist

References

External links 
 

2018 films
English-language Nigerian films
2018 comedy films
2010s English-language films